The Revolution of the Reforms was a military movement in Venezuela between June 7, 1835, and March 1, 1836, against the government of José María Vargas, the conservative Congress, and the influence of José Antonio Páez. It was led by outstanding independence heroes such as Santiago Mariño, Diego Ibarra, Pedro Briceño Méndez, José Laurencio Silva, José María Melo, Blas Bruzual, Luis Perú de Lacroix, Pedro Carujo, José Tadeo Monagas, Renato Beluche, Andrés Level de Goda, and Estanislao Rendon.

Ideology 
The rebels demanded, in the first place, the reconstitution of Gran Colombia and political reforms such as the establishment of federalism, the establishment of military jurisdiction, the state religion and the vindication of the name of the Liberator Simón Bolívar. They denounced the existence of the "oligarchy", strengthened by import and export trade and the protection of Gran Colombia.

The reformists opposed the Vargas government and the Congress, which represented the alliance between the "goths", so called because they supported Spanish domination and belonged to the royalist side during the war of independence, and "conservatives", white criollos, liberals in the economic and political, with General Páez and his supporters. The military considered an affront the return of their estates to the "goths", which had been given in payment for their military service to many fighters for independence. The military jurisdiction of the members of the Liberation Army was also abolished. They viewed the 'mixed' centre-federal form of government as a way of imposing the hegemony of the oligarchy of Caracas and Valencia. José María Vargas objects to the 1% subsidiary tax bill proposed by Congress, but the chambers approve it. Vargas responds by invoking the violation of the constitution by the Senate. On April 29, 1835, Vargas submitted his resignation, alleging that he did not have sufficient strength to maintain peace between the warring factions. Although the resignation was not accepted, his opponents interpreted it as a sign of weakness.

Rebellion 

On June 7, 1835, the insurrection broke out in Maracaibo, proclaiming the federal system and General Santiago Mariño as head of the armed movement; Although this uprising failed, it was only the beginning of the uprising throughout the country. In Caracas, the rebellion broke out on the night of July 7–8, 1835. Pedro Carujo, chief of the Anzoátegui battalion, and then-Captain Julián Castro, placed President Vargas under house arrest on July 8. On that occasion, the famous dialogue between Carujo and Vargas takes place, which historiography has recorded for posterity: "The world belongs to the brave," Carujo tells Vargas. To which the president replies: “No, the world belongs to the just man; it is the good man, and not the brave, who has always lived and will live happily on earth and secure in his conscience».

Vargas and Vice President Andrés Narvarte were exiled to the Danish island of Saint Thomas.

After taking power in Caracas, on July 9, 1835, the military chief Pedro Briceño Méndez released a Manifesto in which he condemned both the National Constitution and the set of laws enacted during the presidency of José Antonio Páez, and it was proposed that the leadership of the reform process would be in charge of the patriots who years before had shed their blood in the War of Independence.

General Santiago Mariño was appointed as superior chief of the new government and General Pedro Carujo as chief of troops. After totally controlling Caracas, the movement spread throughout Venezuela, from Zulia, the east and Carabobo.

Páez, who had temporarily been removed from the government, after the defeat of his candidate Carlos Soublette in the presidential elections of 1834, marched from his property in San Pablo, 190 km from Caracas, to support the dismissed authorities, from July 15, 1835. Given his military prestige and his popularity, when Páez passed through Valencia, Maracay and La Victoria, he recruited numerous militiamen and also part of the troops that, under the command of General José Laurencio Silva, had been sent from Caracas to fight it.

Defeat 
Páez entered Caracas on July 28, 1835, after the capital had been abandoned by the reformists. He established a Government Council and entrusted General José María Carreño in charge of the Presidency, at the same time he sent a commission to Saint Thomas to bring back Vargas and Narvarte. On August 20, 1835, Vargas recovered the presidency of the Republic.

Mariño and his followers took refuge in the east of the country, protected by José Tadeo Monagas. On November 3, 1835, Paez decreed a pardon for the main leaders of the revolution, who were still fighting in the east. Most of the rebels stopped fighting, but on December 17, 1835, a group of reformers under the command of Blas Bruzual and Pedro Carujo took the plaza of Puerto Cabello and declared the port under a state of siege. Páez and General León de Febres Cordero took part in the fighting in which both Bruzual and Carujo were captured on December 24, 1835. 

Carujo was wounded, and as a result of the infection he died in Valencia while Bruzual was imprisoned and would later escape to head to Colombia. Finally, with the control of Maracaibo on January 1, 1836, and then with the surrender of Puerto Cabello on March 1, 1836, the armed conflict came to an end. After the defeat of the rebellion, President Vargas, faced with the majority of Congress, resigned from the presidency on April 24, 1836. The defeat of the reformists meant the triumph of conservative civilism and its regime of constitutional institutions.

See also 
 Elections in Venezuela

References 

Wars involving Venezuela
1830s in Venezuela
Civil wars involving the states and peoples of South America
Venezuelan rebels